The Agart (also Акарт Akart) is a river in Osh Region, Kyrgyzstan. Its source is in the Kichi-Alay range, part of the Alay Range, and it discharges into the Aravansay.

References 

Rivers of Kyrgyzstan